Dame Margaret Eve Hodge, Lady Hodge,  (née Oppenheimer, formerly Watson; born 8 September 1944) is a British politician serving as the Member of Parliament (MP) for Barking since 1994. A member of the Labour Party, she previously served as Leader of Islington London Borough Council from 1982 to 1992. She has held a number of ministerial roles and served as Chair of the Public Accounts Committee from 2010 to 2015.

Hodge is the daughter of the co-founder of steel firm Stemcor and remains a major shareholder. She was a councillor on Islington Council from 1973 to 1994, was chair of the Housing Committee, and then Council Leader from 1982 to 1992. Hodge later apologised for failing to ensure that allegations of serious child abuse in council-run homes were sufficiently investigated and for libelling a complainant.

Hodge was elected to parliament in a 1994 by-election. She was appointed Junior Minister for Disabled People in 1998 and promoted to Minister for Universities in 2001, subsequently becoming the first Children's Minister in 2003, joining the Privy Council. In 2005, Hodge became Minister of State for Work. Hodge served as Minister of State for Culture and Tourism from 2007 to 2008 and 2009 until Labour was defeated at the 2010 general election. She has remained in the House of Commons as a backbencher since then.

Hodge has announced that she will not seek re-election in the next general election.

Early life
Hodge was born on 8 September 1944 in Cairo, Egypt, to Jewish refugee parents Hans Oppenheimer (1908–1985), and his wife Lisbeth (née Hollitscher). Hans Oppenheimer left Stuttgart in Germany during the 1930s to join his uncle's metals business based in Cairo and Alexandria, where he met fellow émigrée, Austrian-born Lisbeth Hollitscher. Married in 1936, Hans and Lisbeth went on to have five children: four girls and a boy.

At the outset of World War II, the couple and their eldest daughter were rendered stateless, effectively stranded in the Kingdom of Egypt for the duration of the War.  They decided to leave Egypt in 1948, concerned that antisemitism had increased in the Middle East during the 1948 Arab-Israeli War.  The family moved to Orpington, Kent (present day Greater London), where they started their family-owned steel-trading corporation, Stemcor.  It is now one of the world's largest privately held steel companies, with an annual turnover of over £6 billion in 2011.  Hodge is a major shareholder, listing her holdings in the Parliamentary Register of Members' Interests. Stemcor was run by her brother, Ralph, until September 2013.

When Hodge was ten, in 1954, her mother died of stomach cancer. Hodge attended Bromley High School, followed by Oxford High School as a boarder. She went on to study at the London School of Economics, graduating with a third-class degree in Economics, majoring in Government, in 1966. After working briefly on television political programmes, she started a Masters in philosophy at Bedford College, London, but did not complete it.

Hodge supported the CND Aldermaston Marches and protests over the Vietnam war.

Early career
From 1966 to 1971, Hodge worked in market research at Unilever, and in PR at Weber Shandwick. From 1992 to 1994, she was a senior consultant at Price Waterhouse.

Islington Council
Hodge was first elected as a Councillor for the London Borough of Islington at a by-election in 1973, representing the Barnsbury ward. She became chair of the Housing Committee in 1975. This was an important post in a local authority which had one of the worst set of housing statistics in London during a period when London boroughs were required to be housing providers and managers.  Hodge's tenure as Housing Chairman oversaw the continuation of a large new housing programme. There was a change of emphasis to the refurbishment of sound older buildings (e.g. Charteris Road, Alexander Road areas), in response to a paper published by the Islington Housing Action Group.

The Islington Labour Party was badly affected by the defection of members and elected representatives to the Social Democratic Party. In the 1978 council election she was elected to Thornhill ward, before representing Barnsbury again at the 1982 election, and moving to Sussex ward at the 1986 election.

After Labour won all but one of the council seats in the 1982 council election on a strong left-wing manifesto, Hodge became Council Leader, a post she held until 1992. In 1984 Hodge was a public leader of Islington participating in the rate-capping rebellion to the Conservative government's imposition of spending restrictions on councils, setting no council rate. As with other councils, the district auditor ordered Islington to set a legal rate, which it complied with hours before the deadline. Hodge and the council were often portrayed as part of the "loony left" by some newspapers. In 1994 Hodge was disqualified as a councillor after not attending council meetings for over six months; Hodge stated she had not been active out of respect for the new council leadership.

Child abuse controversy
The end of Hodge's service on Islington Council, prior to her entering Parliament, was marred by the emergence of serious child abuse allegations concerning Council-run children's homes in Islington. She has apologised several times since the emergence of the scandal in the 1980s that directly linked her council tenure with what she admitted in 2014 was "shameful naivety" in ignoring the complaints of paedophile victims.

In 1985, Demetrios Panton wrote to Islington Council to complain about abuse suffered while in Council care during the 1970s and 1980s. Panton received an official response in 1989, in which the Council denied all responsibility. In 1990, Liz Davies, a senior social worker employed by the borough with her manager, David Cofie, raised concerns about sexual abuse of children under the care of Islington Council. Correspondence between Hodge and the then Director of Social Work indicates that Hodge declined a request for extra investigative resources. Instead, the Cofie–Davies investigation was dismissed by council officials in May 1990 after the police declared they had found insufficient evidence of abuse; despite this, the two social workers continued their enquiries.

In 1992, the Evening Standard resumed reporting allegations of abuse in the Islington Care Homes.  Its initial report was slated by Hodge as a "sensationalist piece of gutter journalism", although she has since apologised, claiming that her officials had given her false information. In 1995, the "White Report" into sexual abuse in Islington Care Homes confirmed that the council had failed to adequately investigate the allegations, claiming that its doctrinaire interpretation of equal opportunities created a climate of fear at being labelled  homophobic.

In 2003, following Hodge's appointment as Minister for Children, Panton went public with his allegations that he had been the subject of abuse in Islington Council care and that, although he had repeatedly raised the matter, he had been ignored. He identified Hodge's complacency as ultimately responsible for the abuse that he alleged he had suffered. Liz Davies simultaneously went public regarding the concerns she had previously raised while working for the council. Following a media campaign by several national newspapers calling for Hodge to resign from her new post, she wrote to Panton, apologising for referring to him as "an extremely disturbed person" in an earlier letter to the Chairman of the BBC Gavyn Davies, which had been broadcast on Radio 4's Today programme. This was subsequently brought to the floor of the House of Commons in Prime Minister's Questions by opposition leader Michael Howard. A formal apology to Panton was made in the High Court on 19 November 2003 by Lady Hodge's barrister together with a financial settlement of £30,000.

In April 2014, Education Secretary Michael Gove instigated investigations into 21 children's homes nationally, where new evidence suggested Jimmy Savile might have abused young people, including one in Islington during the period Hodge was leader. This prompted Hodge to issue a further apology stating "our naivety was shameful". The investigation failed to reach any firm conclusions.

Parliamentary career
Hodge has served as the Labour MP for Barking since the by-election on 9 June 1994 following the death of Jo Richardson. Whilst still a new MP, she endorsed the candidature of Tony Blair, a former Islington neighbour, for the Labour Party leadership, after the sudden death of John Smith from a heart attack. In 2017, she had a majority of 21,608. On 2 December  2021 she announced she would not be standing at the next general election

Ministerial roles
Hodge was appointed Junior Minister for Disabled People in 1998 and was promoted Minister for Universities at the new Department for Education and Skills in 2001, in which capacity she piloted the controversial Higher Education Act 2004, remaining in post until 2003, when she became the inaugural Children's Minister. She was sworn into the Privy Council on 22 June 2003.

In 2003, Hodge was appointed to the newly created high-profile role of Children's minister, which included responsibility for Special Education, Early Years Education and Childcare, the Young People's Unit, teenage pregnancy, the Family Policy Unit, and general responsibility for child welfare.

In 2005, Hodge was moved to become Minister of State for Work. On 17 June 2005, she was criticised for saying that former employees of MG Rover would be able to obtain jobs at Tesco, a local supermarket. Later, she claimed that this was not what she meant, rather that she had empathy for those losing their jobs, and was pointing to a new Tesco supermarket as an example of new jobs being created in the area in face of the redundancies at the car manufacturing plant.

On 27 June 2007, Hodge was reappointed Minister of State in the Department for Culture by new Prime Minister Gordon Brown. As Minister of State for Culture, Creative Industries and Tourism, she was quick to criticise Britain's foremost classical music festival, The Proms, for not being sufficiently inclusive, instead praising popular television shows such as Coronation Street. Following the Cabinet reshuffle of 3 October 2008, it was announced that Hodge was "temporarily leaving Government on compassionate grounds of family illness and will return to Government in the Spring". While she was absent from the Government, she was temporarily replaced as Minister of State by Barbara Follett.  Hodge was reappointed Minister of State responsible for Culture and Tourism on 22 September 2009. In January 2010, Hodge announced that Royal Parks, which manages Richmond Park and Bushy Park in the London Borough of Richmond upon Thames among others, was to be allowed to charge car drivers £2 per visit. This announcement sparked protests in South London and was opposed by local politicians including Conservative Zac Goldsmith, Liberal Democrats Sir Vince Cable and Baroness Kramer.

Barking and the BNP

Hodge once called for British-born families to have priority on council house waiting lists over immigrants. This comment received praise from the far-right political party the BNP and led to calls for Hodge to resign. However, her comments would be defended by her colleagues.

In April 2006, Hodge commented in an interview with The Sunday Telegraph that eight out of ten white working-class voters in her constituency might be tempted to vote for the British National Party (BNP) at the May 2006 local elections because "no one else is listening to them" about their concerns over unemployment, high house prices and the housing of asylum seekers in the area. She said the Labour Party must promote "very, very strongly the benefits of the new, rich multi-racial society which is part of this part of London for me". There was widespread media coverage of her remarks, and Hodge was strongly criticised for giving the BNP publicity. The BNP went on to gain eleven council seats at the 2006 election out of a total of 51, making them the second-largest party. It was reported that Labour activists accused Hodge of generating hundreds of extra votes for the BNP, and that local members began to privately discuss the possibility of a move to deselect her. The GMB wrote to Hodge in May 2006, demanding her resignation.

Writing in The Observer on 20 May 2007 Hodge argued that established families should take priority in the allocation of social housing over new economic migrants, stating that "We should look at policies where the legitimate sense of entitlement felt by the indigenous family overrides the legitimate need demonstrated by the new migrants." Her comments were condemned by the Refugee Council and other representative bodies.

In November 2009, the Leader of the BNP, Nick Griffin, announced that he intended to contest the Barking seat at the 2010 general election. In spite of the union's position, Hodge was the Labour candidate and was returned as the Member of Parliament, doubling her majority, whilst Griffin finished in third place behind the Conservatives. The BNP lost all their council seats in the 2010 election.

Public Accounts Committee
On 10 June 2010 Hodge was elected by MPs to the Chair of the Public Accounts Committee in the fifth round of voting using the single transferable vote system. According to Peter Riddell, under Hodge's leadership, the PAC has held civil servants to account using procedure contrary to established practice.  Gus O'Donnell, then head of the civil service, accused her of presiding over a "theatrical exercise in public humiliation", while Alan Duncan accused her of being "abusive and bullying" towards Rona Fairhead.

The Oppenheimers' family company, Stemcor, which had been founded by Hodge's father, Hans Oppenheimer, was run by her brother, Ralph, until September 2013. In November 2012, Helia Ebrahimi, The Daily Telegraphs City Correspondent, raised the issue of Hodge's suitability as chair of the Public Accounts Committee, reporting that her family's company "pays just 0.01pc tax on £2.1bn of business generated in the UK". This led to an investigation into the tax arrangements of a number of American companies operating in the United Kingdom. In April 2015, The Times reported that Hodge had benefited from the closure in 2011 of a Liechtenstein foundation which held shares in Stemcor, using the Liechtenstein Disclosure Facility, a legal means of returning undisclosed assets to the UK with reduced penalties. Hodge gained 96,000 shares worth £1,500,000 as a result. Hodge said she had played no part in administering or establishing the scheme. She explained: "All I could do as a shareholder in a company not run by me, and over which I had no influence or control, was to ensure that any shares I held were above board and that I paid all relevant taxes in full. Every time I received any benefit from the company this happened."

Shortly after Labour's defeat at the 2015 general election, it emerged that Hodge would not be standing for re-election to the Public Accounts Committee. She was succeeded as Chair in June 2015 by Meg Hillier. Hodge has since written a book about her time as chair of the Public Accounts Committee entitled Called to Account.

Garden Bridge Project review 
In September 2016, London Mayor Sadiq Khan asked Hodge to review the Garden Bridge project. Hodge was tasked with determining whether value for money was achieved from the taxpayers' £60 million contribution to the bridge, as well as investigating whether transparency standards were met by public bodies. Hodge's review was published in April 2017. Hodge recommended that 'It would be better for the taxpayer to accept the financial loss of cancelling the project than to risk the potential uncertain additional costs to the public purse if the project proceeds.' The report found that decisions on the Garden Bridge were driven more by electoral cycles than value for taxpayers' money, and that there was not an open, fair and competitive process around two procurements. In response, the BBC's transport correspondent, Tom Edwards, reported that 'I can't remember reading a report so damning of a transport project.'

In June 2017, Andrew Boff, a Conservative member of the London Assembly, criticised Margaret Hodge's report on the Garden Bridge, and claimed that she broke Parliamentary rules during her research. In December 2017, the Parliamentary Standards Committee found that Hodge had breached the MPs' code of conduct. The code states MPs should use public resources only "in support of parliamentary duties". The committee ruled that, because the review had been commissioned by an outside body, it had not been carried out as part of Hodge's parliamentary activities. The committee recommended that Hodge apologise to the House of Commons for the breach on a point of order. Hodge subsequently apologised and said "I carried out this inquiry in good faith and in the public interest. "I think all MPs would benefit from greater clarity in the rules governing the use of offices." Hodge later repaid £2.97, which represented the cost of House of Commons stationery, after the committee's report found that she should not have used Parliamentary resources for her review. In response to the findings of the Parliamentary Standards Committee's investigation, Andrew Boff said the committee's findings left "a sour taste", and claimed that he found it 'hard to believe [Hodge] was unaware of the rules."

Views
At a keynote speech to the Institute for Public Policy Research on 26 November 2004, Hodge defended the concept of greater state regulation of individuals' choices, asserting only that "some may call it the nanny state but I call it a force for good".

On 17 November 2006, it was reported by the Islington Tribune that Hodge described the Iraq War as a "big mistake in foreign affairs". This report, relayed by BBC News, appeared to cast doubt on Hodge's confidence in Tony Blair's foreign policy since 1998. A Downing Street spokesperson responded by pointing out that "Margaret Hodge voted for military action in Iraq. Since then, she has always spoken in favour of it."

In the  2015 Labour Party leadership election, she nominated Liz Kendall.

In June 2016, together with Ann Coffey, Hodge called for a motion of no confidence in party leader Jeremy Corbyn. The following month, she supported Owen Smith in the 2016 Labour Party (UK) leadership election.

Views on antisemitism in Labour

In July 2018, the National Executive Committee (NEC) adopted a code of conduct on antisemitism which was based on the IHRA's working definition while omitting or modifying examples of antisemitism, including defining how criticism of Israel can be antisemitic. Hodge subsequently said that Labour's refusal to adopt the full set of unamended examples for disciplinary purposes "make the party a hostile environment for Jews. It chose to entrench antisemitism ... This means that in 2018 a party member can call a Jew a Nazi and face little consequence." In contrast, a coalition of 36 international Jewish anti-Zionist groups signed a letter of opposition to the IHRA definition, calling it a "distorted definition of antisemitism to stifle criticism of Israel". Labour said all the examples were covered by other parts of the code. After the adoption of the new code, Hodge confronted Labour leader Jeremy Corbyn in parliament and called him "a fucking antisemite and a racist". The Party initiated a disciplinary investigation of the incident, with a spokesperson saying that "The rules of the Parliamentary Labour Party are quite clear, that colleagues have to treat each other with respect and not bring the party into disrepute and that is why action will be taken." The investigation was terminated following fears that MPs would resign had it continued. A Labour spokesperson said that Hodge "expressed regret" for her remarks: however, Hodge said that there were "no apologies, on either side". Hodge said that the prospect of an investigation had made her think about "what it felt like to be a Jew in Germany in the 30s", a remark described by Jewish journalist, Matthew Norman, as "deranged hyperbole", "absurd" and "grotesque" and by David Baddiel as "bollocks".

In March 2019, Hodge made a secret recording of a meeting she had with Corbyn. The recording was later passed to The Sunday Times which published extracts. In the recording, Corbyn said that some evidence of complaints was being mislaid, ignored or not used, which was why he had asked Lord Falconer to review the process. Corbyn later wrote to Hodge to convey his disappointment at what he considered "to be a total breach of trust and privacy". In the same month, she proposed that the party close down constituencies that passed motions critical of individual investigations or of the IHRA's Working Definition.

In June 2019, Hodge condemned the reinstatement to Labour of Chris Williamson who was investigated for comments he made on antisemitism in the Labour Party.

In July 2019, Hodge called for a new and entirely independent system to handle antisemitism disciplinary proceedings in the Labour party as, she said, political interference has corrupted the current system. The party rejected her claim as unfounded. She also stated that matters had only become worse since she confronted Corbyn a year before.

In September 2019, Hodge said  "I'm not going to give up until Jeremy Corbyn ceases to be leader of the Labour Party."

In July 2018, she accepted an invitation to become an honorary patron of the Campaign Against Antisemitism (CAA).  In the run up to the 2019 general election, CAA asked her to resign because she was standing as a Labour Party candidate; she did so but described their decision as "both astonishing and wounding", showing a lack of respect and impugning her integrity.

Antisemitism investigation

In July 2019, Hodge shared with the media a clandestine photo of Corbyn meeting Charedi activist Shraga Stern. Hodge tweeted that "Having lunch & wondering why Corbyn wants to be seen talking to an anti-LGBT activist who doesn't represent the mainstream Jewish community yet chooses to sideline groups like Jewish Labour." Stern subsequently lodged a formal complaint with the Labour Party that Hodge's tweet was an "antisemitic attack" and sidelined him as a "second-class Jew".

Other events
In 2004, Fathers 4 Justice campaigner Jonathan Stanesby handcuffed Hodge, stating he was arresting her for child abuse. Fathers 4 Justice targeted Hodge perceiving her as the "bogeywoman of family law, who doesn't even believe in equal parenting". Stanesby and collaborator Jason Hatch were acquitted of the charge of false imprisonment which they successfully defended as a reasonable form of political protest.

In June 2019, the TSSA conference passed a motion criticising Hodge for "endorsing tactical voting, including voting for candidates other than Labour" in the 2019 European Parliament election, pointing out that this was a breach of party rules and should result in automatic removal of membership.

On 28 September 2019, Barking Labour members voted in a 'trigger ballot' to hold a full selection process to choose their parliamentary candidate for the next general election, rather than automatically reselecting Hodge. She said she wished to stand and was automatically included in an all woman shortlist. According to one local member, factors in the decision to hold a selection process included her age, the desire to have an MP who lives in the area and support for the principles of accountability and local democracy. On Monday 28 October 2019, Hodge was reselected.

Non-political roles
Since November 2018, Hodge has been Chair of Council at Royal Holloway, University of London, following the Privy Council consenting to the position being remunerated. Hitherto, this role had always been a voluntary position.

Personal life
Hodge describes herself as a secular Jew, but that her religious background is "what defines me". Hodge married Andrew Watson in 1968; the couple had one son and a daughter, Lizzi Watson, a BBC journalist who was appointed deputy editor of the 6 pm and 10 pm BBC News in February 2018.  They divorced in 1978 and in the same year she married Henry Hodge (later Sir Henry), by whom she had two more daughters. He was a solicitor who was appointed as a High Court Judge in 2004. He died in 2009.

Use of offshore tax haven

In 2015 there was considerable controversy about her benefiting, to the tune of £1.5 million, from assets repatriated from a Lichtenstein family trust in 2011 using the Liechtenstein disclosure facility, that reduced penalties and removed the risk of prosecution for Britons moving undeclared assets back to the UK. Coverage focused on the apparent hypocrisy in her condemnation of the use of tax havens.  The Times reported that 75% of the shares in the family trust had previously been held in Panama, which Hodge had previously criticised for its financial secrecy and use as a tax haven. Hodge issued a statement that she had always fully declared the shareholding, never had a management role in the company, and had received assurances that the company always paid the appropriate tax.

Honours

Hodge was appointed a Member of the Order of the British Empire (MBE) in 1978, and promoted to Dame Commander of the Order of the British Empire (DBE) in the Dissolution Honours List of 27 August 2015.

References

External links
Dame Margaret Hodge MP Official constituency website
Barking Labour Party
Debrett's People of Today

 

|-

|-

|-

|-

1944 births
Living people
20th-century British women politicians
20th-century English women politicians
20th-century English politicians
21st-century British women politicians
Alumni of the London School of Economics
Chairs of the Fabian Society
Councillors in the London Borough of Islington
Dames Commander of the Order of the British Empire
Egyptian Ashkenazi Jews
Egyptian emigrants to England
English people of Austrian-Jewish descent
English people of German-Jewish descent
Female members of the Parliament of the United Kingdom for English constituencies
Ministers for Universities (United Kingdom)
Jewish British politicians
Jewish women politicians
Labour Friends of Israel
Labour Party (UK) MPs for English constituencies
Leaders of local authorities of England
Members of the Privy Council of the United Kingdom
Naturalised citizens of the United Kingdom
People associated with Royal Holloway, University of London
People educated at Oxford High School, England
People from Orpington
UK MPs 1992–1997
UK MPs 1997–2001
UK MPs 2001–2005
UK MPs 2005–2010
UK MPs 2010–2015
UK MPs 2015–2017
UK MPs 2017–2019
UK MPs 2019–present
Wives of knights
Women councillors in England